Tmcft, (Tmc ft), (TMC), (tmc), is the abbreviation of thousand million cubic feet (1,000,000,000 = 109 = 1 billion), commonly used in India in reference to volume of water in a reservoir or river flow.

Conversion
1 tmcft is equivalent to:

 (approx)
 2,831 crore litres
 2.83168466×1010 litres
 2.83168466×107 cubic metres
 22,956.841139 acre feet
 6.228835459×109 imperial gallons

Alternatively, 35.32 tmcft = 1 cubic kilometer (km3) is the standard unit used by Central Water Commission of Government of India for reporting gross and effective storage capacities of dams in India in National Register of Large Dams (NRLD). The amount of water that can be discharged through a conduit per second in a cubic foot is described as a cusec.

In agriculture, a rough estimate by irrigation experts is that 1 TMC water is needed each year to irrigate 10,000 acres.

See also
Kaveri River water dispute

References

Units of volume
Imperial units
Customary units in India